Roberts Scott Blossom (March 25, 1924July 8, 2011) was an American poet and character actor of theatre, film, and television. He is best known for his roles as Old Man Marley in Home Alone (1990) and as Ezra Cobb in the horror film Deranged (1974). He is also remembered for his supporting roles in films such as The Great Gatsby (1974), Close Encounters of the Third Kind (1977), Escape from Alcatraz (1979), Christine (1983), and The Last Temptation of Christ (1988).

Early life
Roberts Scott Blossom was born on March 25, 1924, in New Haven, Connecticut, to John Blossom, an athletic director at Yale University. He was raised in Cleveland but later moved to Shaker Heights, Ohio. He attended Hawken School and graduated from Asheville School in 1941 and attended Harvard University for a year until he joined the United States Army and served in World War II in Europe. He trained as a therapist and later decided to be an actor. He began directing and acting in productions at Karamu House and the Candlelight Theater in Cleveland and later moved to New York City, where he supported himself by bundling feathers for hats and he practiced a disputed therapy called Dianetics. He also waited tables until he became a full-time actor.

Career
Blossom began acting on stage during the 1950s. He won three Obie Awards for his performances in the off-Broadway plays Village Wooing (1955), which was his debut, Do Not Pass Go (1965) and The Ice Age (1976). During the 1960s, he formed Filmstage, a multimedia avant garde theatrical troupe. His Broadway credits include Ballad of the Sad Cafe and Operation Sidewinder and in 1988 he appeared in Peter Brook's production of The Cherry Orchard.

Blossom began appearing on screen in 1958. His first appearance in a feature film was in 1971's The Hospital starring George C. Scott and written by Paddy Chayefsky. During the 1970s he had roles in films including The Great Gatsby (1974) starring Robert Redford and Mia Farrow, Slaughterhouse-Five (1972), Steven Spielberg's Close Encounters of the Third Kind (1977), and Escape from Alcatraz (1979) starring Clint Eastwood. Escape from Alcatraz is perhaps Blossom's best known supporting role for the scene where he chopped off his fingers with an axe.

Blossom is remembered for his role as Ezra Cobb in the 1974 horror film Deranged based on American murderer Ed Gein. According to the 2014 book Mad as Hell: The Making of Network and the Fateful Vision of the Angriest Man in Movies by David Itzkoff, the cast of Chayefsky's multiple Oscar-winning film Network originally included Blossom as media mogul Arthur Jensen, but he was replaced in pre-production by Ned Beatty.

Blossom is also known for starring in the 1983 horror film Christine, a film directed by John Carpenter which is an adaptation of the book by Stephen King. He is best known for his role in the 1990 film Home Alone, in which he played Old Man Marley alongside Macaulay Culkin. He appeared in his final film role in 1995 alongside Sharon Stone and Leonardo DiCaprio in The Quick and The Dead (1995). Blossom's other film credits include Doc Hollywood (1991) starring Michael J. Fox; Reuben, Reuben (1983); Resurrection (1980) starring Ellen Burstyn; Flashpoint (1984); Vision Quest (1985) starring Matthew Modine and Linda Fiorentino; and Always (1989).

Blossom made his first television appearance in 1958 in the television series Naked City. From 1976 to 1978, he starred on the television soap opera Another World, for which he won a Soapy Award for Best Villain. His other television credits include Moonlighting, with Cybill Shepherd and Bruce Willis, Tales from the Darkside, The Equalizer, the revived 1980s version of The Twilight Zone and Chicago Hope. His television films include John Brown's Raid, Family Reunion, with Bette Davis, the 1985 version of Noon Wine, Murder in the Heartland and Disney's Balloon Farm, which was his final role as an actor.

In 2000, Blossom appeared in the biography documentary Full Blossom: The Life of Poet/Actor Roberts Blossom, in which he talked about his life as an actor and poet. The documentary also featured his children Debbie and Michael, his first wife Beverly, and Ed Asner, Peter Brook and Robert Frank.

Personal life
Blossom was formerly married to Beverly Schmidt Blossom, with whom he had a son, Michael, and who died on November 1, 2014, of cancer. He was later married to Marylin Orshan Blossom until her death in 1982, with whom he had a daughter, Deborah Blossom.

After Blossom retired from acting in the late 1990s, he moved to Berkeley, California, and spent his time writing poetry. He later moved to Santa Monica, where he died in 2011.

Death
Blossom died on July 8, 2011, at the age of 87 from cerebrovascular disease. He was residing in a nursing home at the time of his death.

Filmography

Film

Television

Theater credits
 1955: Village Wooing 
 1958: The Infernal Machine (Anubis)
 1961: A Cook for Mr. General (Kroy)
 1963: The Ballad of the Sad Cafe (Merlie Ryan)
 1964: The Physicists
 1965: Do Not Pass Go
 1970: Operation Sidewinder
 1973: Statis Quo Vadis (Mr.Elgin).
 1988: The Cherry Orchard.
 1989: The Chairs (Old Man).

Bibliography
 J O & Y Bookies (2001).
 Poetic Philosophy in the 21st Century (2002).
 River of Wine (2002).
 How It Is We (2002).

References

External links
 
 
 
 
 

1924 births
2011 deaths
Harvard University alumni
Actors from Shaker Heights, Ohio
Male actors from Berkeley, California
Male actors from New Haven, Connecticut
Poets from Connecticut
20th-century American male actors
American male stage actors
American male soap opera actors
American male film actors
20th-century American poets
United States Army personnel of World War II
Neurological disease deaths in California
Deaths from cerebrovascular disease
Burials at Woodlawn Memorial Cemetery, Santa Monica
Male actors from Cleveland
American male television actors